Fanny Clamagirand (born 1984) is a French classical violinist.

Biography and Career 
Born in 1984, Clamagirand started playing the violin at the age of seven. She was taught by L. Kolos, before joining J.J. Kantorow's postgraduate course at the CNSMPD (Paris Conservatory) in 2000, when she was sixteen. In 2003, she went on to study with I. Rashkovsky at London's Royal College of Music, where she was awarded her "Artist's Diploma" (2004). Then, she was coached by P.Vernikov at the Konservatorium in Vienna and Oleksandr Semchuk at the Scuola di Musica di Fiesole (Italy).

Clamagirand has been performing as a soloist in concert from the age of nine. She has appeared at numerous venues and festivals such as Wigmore and Royal Festival Halls in London, Victoria Hall in Geneva, Konzerthaus and Musikverein in Vienna, Konzerthaus in Berlin, KKL in Lucerne, Smetana Hall in Prague, DR Konzerthuset in Copenhagen, Toppan Hall in Tokyo, OperaHouse in Tel-Aviv, Cultural Center in Chicago, Zankel Hall in New York, Academia Santa Cecilia in Roma, Circulo de Bellas Artes in Madrid, Teatro Municipal in Rio de Janeiro, Louisiana Modern Art Museum in Copenhagen, Opera of Montecarlo, Grand Théâtre de Provence in Aix, Arsenal de Metz, Théâtre des Champs-Elysées, UNESCO, Salle Gaveau and Auditorium du Louvre in Paris, Montpellier Radio France Festival, Colmar Festival, Lucerne Festival, Verbier Festival, Enescu Festival, Haydn Festspiele, Menuhin Festival in Gstaad, Lockenhaus Kammermusikfest, Musikfest Bremen, Carintischer Sommer Festival, West Cork Chamber Music Festival, Chelsea Music Festival in New York.

Clamagirand plays on a Matteo Goffriller violin made in Venice in 1700.

Selected recordings 

 Eugène Ysaÿe: Complete Sonatas for solo violin, Fanny Clamagirand, violin (Nascor 2007)
 Camille Saint-Saëns : Complete Violin Concertos, nos 1, 2 & 3, Fanny Clamagirand, violin - Sinfonia Finlandia Jyväskylä, conducted by Patrick Gallois (Naxos 2009)
 Camille Saint-Saëns: Music for Violin and  Piano, Fanny Clamagirand, violin, Vanya Cohen, piano (Volume 1 & 2 Naxos 2011)
 Ludwig Van Beethoven : Violin Concerto, Peter Vasks, '"Distant Light", Violin Concerto, Fanny Clamagirand, violin - English Chamber Orchestra conducted by Ken David Masur (Mirare 2019)
 Camille Saint-Saëns: Danse macabre, Introduction et Rondo Capricioso, Prière, Caprice andalou, Le Déluge, Jota aragonaise, Havanaise, Air de Dalila, Caprice d’après l’étude en forme de valse, Fanny Clamagirand, violin, Vanya Cohen, piano, (Naxos 2021)

Awards 
 First Prize winner of the 2007 Monte Carlo Violin Masters
 Emily Anderson Prize of the Royal Philharmonic Society in 2004 in London

References

External links 
 Official website

21st-century French women classical violinists
1984 births
Living people
Eurovision Young Musicians Finalists